Indian Maiden and Fawn is a 1917–1924 sculpture by Alexander Phimister Proctor.

Description and history
Alexander Phimister Proctor's figural group Indian Maiden and Fawn (1917–1924) is a sculpture depicting a standing nude Native American female with a fawn standing to her right. She wears a headband and braids, and holds out food for the deer in her left hand.

There exist several copies of the sculpture. One copy, made of yellow-leaded brass, is installed within the Jasper County Historical Museum in Newton, Iowa. Fonderia Bruno served as the founder of this statue.

The Jordan Schnitzer Museum of Art, located on the University of Oregon campus in Eugene, Oregon, has a  bronze copy, dated 1926. It was gifted by Narcissa J. Washburne and the Carl Washburne estate in 1962. The statue used to be installed outside the museum until it was overturned by vandals in 1980. Despite being insured and most recently appraised for $12,000, museum officials were uncertain if they could restore the woman's arm, which had broken off.

The Buffalo Bill Center of the West in Cody, Wyoming also has a bronze copy in its collection.

In 2001, Christie's sold a  copy of the sculpture, estimated to be worth between $20,000 and $30,000, for $19,975.

See also
 1924 in art
 List of public art in Eugene, Oregon
 The Pioneer (Eugene, Oregon) and The Pioneer Mother (Eugene, Oregon), other sculptures by Proctor

References

External links

 Proctor Monumental Sculptures at the Proctor Foundation

1924 sculptures
Brass sculptures
Bronze sculptures in Oregon
Bronze sculptures in Wyoming
Cody, Wyoming
Deer in art
Nude sculptures in the United States
Outdoor sculptures in Eugene, Oregon
Sculptures by Alexander Phimister Proctor
Sculptures of Native Americans in Oregon
Sculptures of women in Iowa
Sculptures of women in Oregon
Sculptures of women in Wyoming
Statues in Iowa
Statues in Oregon
Statues in Wyoming
University of Oregon campus